Beware (The Funk Is Everywhere) is a studio album by Afrika Bambaataa, released in 1986 by Tommy Boy Records.

Reception

From contemporary reviews, Melody Maker reviewed the album in 1986 giving it a negative review, finding it redundant, cliched, and boring. Robert Christgau commented that, while it "tops the UTFO albums" musically, he was "grieved to report that only "Kick Out the Jams" overcomes the formlessness of personality his detractors have always charged him with—it's got Bill Laswell all over it."

Track listing

Personnel 
Adapted from the Beware (The Funk Is Everywhere) liner notes.

 Afrika Bambaataa – production (A1, A3, A4, B2, B4)
 Eric Calvi – production (A2)
 Gavin Christopher – production (A3)
 Jason Corsaro
 Craig Derry
 Lee Evans – production (A1, B1)
 Anton Fier: drums, percussion
 Bernard Fowler: vocals
 Fred Fowler 
 Grandmaster Melle Mel: Vocals
 Robin Halpin
 Michael Hampton
 Michael Jonzun – production (B2)
 Steve Knutson

 Bill Laswell – production (A4)
 Keith LeBlanc – production (B2, B4)
 Vince Madison
 Skip McDonald – production (B2, B4)
 Cindy Mizelle
 Paul Pesco: guitars
 Screamin' Rachael
 Rae Serrano – production (A1, B1)
 Nicky Skopelitis
 Rob Stevens
 Pat Thrall: guitars
 Doug Wimbish – production (B2, B4)
 Bernie Worrell: keyboards

Release history

References

References

External links 
 

Afrika Bambaataa albums
1986 albums
Tommy Boy Records albums
Albums produced by Michael Jonzun
Albums produced by Bill Laswell
Albums produced by Keith LeBlanc